Chal is a given name, nickname and surname.  Notable people using this name include the following:

Given name
As a given name:
Chal Daniel (1921 – 1943), American gridiron football player and Army pilot

As a portion of a given name (Burmese names do not have surnames):
Eaint Myat Chal (born 1993), Burmese model and beauty pageant titleholder

Nickname
A.Chal, nickname of Alejandro Chal whose birthname was Alejandro Salazar, Peruvian singer-songwriter and producer

Surname
Kelly Chal, New Zealand politician

See also

Cal (given name)
Cao (Chinese surname)
Cha (Korean surname)
Chad (name)
Chai (surname)
Chala (disambiguation)
Chalk (disambiguation)
Chaly (surname)
Chan (surname)
Chao (surname)
Char (name)
Charl (name)
Chas (given name)
Chay (given name)
Chaz
Coal (disambiguation)